Lyndsay Proctor is a New Zealand former professional rugby league footballer who represented New Zealand in the 1975 and 1977 World Cups.

Playing career
Proctor played for the Ellerslie Eagles in the Auckland Rugby League competition and also represented Auckland. He won the Bert Humphries Memorial as most improved forward in the ARL competition in both 1973 and 1977.

He was first selected for the New Zealand national rugby league team in 1974 and went on to play in both the 1975 and 1977 World Cups. Proctor finished his Kiwis career in 1978 having played in thirteen test matches for New Zealand.

References

Living people
New Zealand rugby league players
New Zealand national rugby league team players
Auckland rugby league team players
Ellerslie Eagles players
Rugby league props
Year of birth missing (living people)